Male Brusnice is a settlement in the hills east of Novo Mesto in southeastern Slovenia. The area is part of the traditional region of Lower Carniola and is now included in the Southeast Slovenia Statistical Region.

An Early Iron Age burial ground has been discovered in the Krevevški boršt area of the settlement. It comprises 24 graves.

References

External links
Male Brusnice on Geopedia

Populated places in the City Municipality of Novo Mesto